Trygve Mikkjel Heyerdahl Reenskaug (born 21 June 1930) is a Norwegian computer scientist and professor emeritus of the University of Oslo. He formulated the model–view–controller (MVC) pattern for graphical user interface (GUI) software design in 1979 while visiting the Xerox Palo Alto Research Center (PARC). His first major software project, "Autokon," produced a successful computer-aided design – computer-aided manufacturing (CAD/CAM) program which was first used in 1963, and continued in use by shipyards worldwide for more than 30 years.

Reenskaug described his early Smalltalk and object-oriented programming conceptual efforts as follows:

He has been extensively involved in research into object-oriented methods and developed the Object Oriented Role Analysis and Modeling (OOram) and the OOram tool in 1983. He founded the information technology company Taskon in 1986, which developed tools based on OOram. The OOram ideas matured and evolved substantially into the BabyUML project, which culminated in creating the data, context and interaction (DCI) paradigm.

Reenskaug wrote the book Working With Objects: The OOram Software Engineering Method with co-authors Per Wold and Odd Arild Lehne.
Later he wrote a virtual machine for Unified Modeling Language (UML). , he is professor emeritus of informatics at the University of Oslo.

References

External links

 
 
  (Part of an article entitled: "Beyond MVC: A new look at the Servlet Infrastructure")
 

1930 births
Living people
Human–computer interaction researchers
Programming language designers
Norwegian computer programmers
20th-century Norwegian scientists
21st-century Norwegian scientists
Norwegian computer scientists
Norwegian company founders
Scientists at PARC (company)